Edward Arnold may refer to:

Edward Arnold (actor) (1890–1956), American actor
Ed Arnold (born 1943), Pennsylvania politician
Eddy Arnold (1918–2008), country singer
Eddie Arnold (1949–2000), English Olympic gymnast
Edward Arnold (publisher), a publishing house

See also
Eduardo Arnold (born 1947), Argentine politician

Arnold, Edward